Kazuki Yamaguchi may refer to:

, Japanese footballer
, Japanese footballer